Nicole Moudaber  is a Lebanese/British event promoter, record label founder, radio personality, and DJ/producer. She is the head of her own imprint MOOD Records  and runs an award-winning weekly radio show, In The MOOD.

Biography
Nicole Moudaber was born in Nigeria. She began her career promoting dance parties in Beirut, Lebanon during the 1990s, before transferring to London where she established herself as a DJ and producer. She came to the attention of Carl Cox in 2009 when she signed to his record label Intec. She released her first album Believe in 2013 on Drumcode Records.

Moudaber has been featured by Billboard, The New York Times, CNN, PAPER Magazine, Mixmag, and Dancing Astronaut.

Moudaber started In The Mood Radio in 2014 and it broadcasts weekly in over 50 countries, on over 70 FM stations. Moudaber is also an Ambassador of the Association For Electronic Music (AFEM) alongside Armin van Buuren, Nile Rodgers, Pete Tong, Seth Troxler, Louie Vega and others.

Philanthropy 
Moudaber is a public advocate of Lower Eastside Girls Club, an organization that helps disadvantaged young women pursue a career in music.

MOOD Records 
Moudaber launched her own imprint, MOOD Records, on 25 February 2013 with the release of her In The Mood EP. The official launch party for the imprint took place at Pacha NYC on Saturday, 26 January. The imprint has released music from Moudaber, Carl Cox, Carlo Lio, Francisco Allendes, Joel Mull, Juvenal (SKIN), Marino Canal, Pan-Pot, Pleasurekraft and Victor Calderone. In 2015, Moudaber collaborated with Skin from Skunk Anansie to release the "Breed" EP. A remix EP titled ‘'BREED The RMXS'’ was released in 2016, featuring remixes from Carl Craig, Fur Coat, Hector, Jamie Jones, Paco Osuna, Pan-Pot, and Scuba.

Touring

MoodRAW 
In September 2014, Moudaber announced her "MoodRAW" tour which saw her play in underground transformed spaces such as warehouses. The events were in five cities: London, Montreal, Chicago, Los Angeles, and Brooklyn. The tour included artists such as Anja Schneider, Joel Mull, Marino Canal, Victor Calderone, Raiz and Danny Tenaglia.

MoodZONE 
May 2016 saw the debut of Moudaber's festival stage concept, titled "MoodZONE", at Electric Daisy Carnival: New York where she played back-to-back with Chris Liebing and also hosted and selected Lauren Lane, Mind Against, Paco Osuna, and Thugfucker for the stage. MoodZONE also appeared at Insomniac's flagship event in June 2017, Electric Daisy Carnival: Las Vegas, at the NeonGarden stage, with Chris Liebing, Cristoph, DJ Tennis, Pan-Pot, Shmitty, and Solardo. In July 2017, it was announced that MoodZONE would appear at Utopia Island in Munich, Germany on 12 August and Escape: Psycho Circus in San Bernardino, California on 28 October. Along with Moudaber, similar acts such as Chris Liebing, DJ Tennis, Lauren Lane, Paco Osuna, Pan-Pot and Shmitty would be performing at the event as well.

MoodDAY 
In 2016, for Winter Music Conference, Nicole announced her MoodDAY Miami Pool Party concept to celebrate the 100th episode of her Mood Radio show.

Festivals 
Moudaber often plays at DC-10, Amnesia, Space Ibiza.

Moudaber has also played a number of festivals including Coachella, Electric Daisy Carnival, Tomorrowland, Glastonbury, Movement Detroit, and Mysteryland USA.

Discography

Albums
Include 
Believe (2013)

Singles & EPs
Include 
See You Next Tuesday Remixes (MOOD, 2017)
Empty Space EP (Intec Digital, 2017)
Your Love Picks Me Up (Truesoul, 2017)
Love Someone Else (MOOD, 2016)
Silent Sigh EP (MOOD, 2016)
Where Shadows Lie (Intec Digital, 2016)
BREED (MOOD, 2015)
Somewhere in our Minds (Truesoul, 2015)
Her Dub Material (MOOD, 2015)
The Whippin' I'm Dishin''' (MOOD, 2014)Bittersweet EP (Drumcode, 2014)See You Next Tuesday (MOOD, 2014)One Day Later (Intec Digital, 2014)Give Me Body (MOOD, 2013)In The Mood (MOOD, 2013)Roar (Intec Digital, 2013)Sonic Language EP (Drumcode, 2013)In the Mood (MOOD Records, 2013)The Journey Begins (Drumcode, 2012)Hair (Leena Music, 2012)I'm A Gangsta (Kling Klong, 2012)Different Meanings (8 Sided Dice Recordings, 2011)Who Said EP (Waveform Recordings, 2011)Feline EP (Intec Digital, 2011)Break It EP (Kling Klong, 2011)She Wears the Pants (Intacto Records, 2010)Mi Cabeza (Monique Spéciale, 2010)Home Sweet Home (Yellow Tail, 2010)Get Fresh (Nocturnal Groove, 2008)

Compilations
Include Mood 50 – The Best of Mood'' (MOOD, 2017)

Awards and nominations/accomplishments

Online Radio Awards

|-
| 2014
| Nicole Moudaber 'In The Mood Radio'
| Best Online Music Show, Dance/Electronic
|  
|-
| 2015
| Nicole Moudaber 'In The Mood Radio'
| Best Online Music Show, Dance/Electronic
|  
|-
| 2016
| Nicole Moudaber 'In The Mood Radio'
| Overall winner, Best Online Music Show
|  
|-

DJ Awards

|-
| 2013
| Nicole Moudaber
| Best Techno DJ
| 
|-
| 2014
| Nicole Moudaber
| Best Techno DJ
| 
|-
| 2016 
| Nicole Moudaber
| Best Techno DJ 
| 
|-
| 2017 
| Nicole Moudaber
| Best Techno DJ 
| 
|-

International Dance Music Awards

|-
| 2012
| Nicole Moudaber
| Best Minimal/Techno Track for "Chemistry (Nicole Moudaber Remix) - Carl Cox" - Intec
| 
|-
| 2014
| Nicole Moudaber
| Best Tech-House/Techno Track for "Roar" 
| 
|-
| 2016
| Nicole Moudaber
| Best Techno/Tech House DJ 
| 
|-
| 2016
| Nicole Moudaber
| Best Tech House/Techno Track for Giv Me Luv (Nicole Moudaber Remix) - Alcatraz 
|

Electronic Music Awards

References

External links

Businesspeople from Lagos
Club DJs
Women DJs
Living people
Musicians from Lagos
Nigerian record producers
Techno musicians
House musicians
Women in electronic music
1977 births
21st-century women musicians
Women record producers
Nigerian emigrants to the United Kingdom